Epicolpodes is a genus of beetles in the family Carabidae, containing the following species:

 Epicolpodes amydrus Basilewsky, 1985
 Epicolpodes benschi (Alluaud, 1909)
 Epicolpodes juratulus Basilewsky, 1985
 Epicolpodes perviridis Basilewsky, 1985
 Epicolpodes sikorai (Alluaud, 1897)
 Epicolpodes tanala (Alluaud, 1909)

References

Platyninae